2006 Czech Lion Awards ceremony was held on 5 March 2005.

Winners and nominees

Non-statutory Awards

References

2004 film awards
Czech Lion Awards ceremonies